McKinley "Jack" Wallace was an American Negro league second baseman between 1926 and 1931.

Wallace played for the Bacharach Giants in 1926, posting a .229 batting average in 17 recorded games. He also played briefly for the Cleveland Cubs in 1931.

References

External links
 and Seamheads

Year of birth missing
Year of death missing
Place of birth missing
Place of death missing
Bacharach Giants players
Cleveland Cubs players
Baseball second basemen